Kankan Airport  (or Kankan Diankana Airport) is an airport serving Kankan, capital of the Kankan Region in Guinea.

The airport was formerly within Kankan, with the ICAO code of GUXN. The old runway is now a street in the city.

See also

Transport in Guinea
List of airports in Guinea

References

External links
OpenStreetMap - Kankan Airport
SkyVector - Kankan Airport

 Google Earth

Airports in Guinea
Kankan